The Traffic Cop is a 1926 American silent drama film directed by Harry Garson and starring Maurice 'Lefty' Flynn, Kathleen Myers, and Nigel Barrie.

Plot
As described in a film magazine review, Joe Regan, a young traffic officer who has adopted an orphaned  boy, takes his charge to a seaside resort to help him recuperate from an injury. There he meets Alicia Davidson, a young woman whom he has met in the line of duty, and a warm friendship develops. The young woman’s father one night becomes intoxicated while in the company of the policeman, and the latter is blamed. However, Alicia relents, and when the policeman saves her and others from death, she promises to become his wife.

Cast
 Maurice 'Lefty' Flynn as Joe Regan
 Kathleen Myers as Alicia Davidson 
 James A. Marcus as Radcliffe Davidson 
 Adele Farrington as Mrs. Davidson 
 Ray Ripley as Marmalade Laidlaw 
 Nigel Barrie as Harvey Phillips 
 Ray Turner as Tapioca

References

Bibliography
 Munden, Kenneth White. The American Film Institute Catalog of Motion Pictures Produced in the United States, Part 1. University of California Press, 1997.

External links

1926 films
1926 drama films
Silent American drama films
Films directed by Harry Garson
American silent feature films
1920s English-language films
Film Booking Offices of America films
American black-and-white films
1920s American films